Anne Elizabeth Jardin (born July 26, 1959), later known by her married name Anne Alexander, is a Canadian former competition swimmer who won two bronze medals at the 1976 Summer Olympics in her hometown of Montreal.

She finished third in the women's 4x100-metre freestyle relay, alongside Becky Smith, Gail Amundrud and Barbara Clark, and also ended up in third place in the 4x100 medley relay, with Wendy Cook, Robin Corsiglia and Susan Sloan.  She broke the world record in the 50-metre freestyle on August 19, 1978, in Etobicoke, Ontario.

Jardin is currently a physical education teacher, as well as a Student Success teacher at Frank Ryan Senior Elementary School in Ottawa, Ontario.

Her niece, Barbara Jardin, is a swimmer who competed at the 2012 Summer Olympics.

See also
 List of Olympic medalists in swimming (women)
 List of Commonwealth Games medallists in swimming (women)
 World record progression 50 metres freestyle

References

External links
 Canadian Olympic Committee

1959 births
Living people
Canadian female freestyle swimmers
Commonwealth Games gold medallists for Canada
World record setters in swimming
Olympic bronze medalists for Canada
Olympic bronze medalists in swimming
Olympic swimmers of Canada
Pan American Games bronze medalists for Canada
Pan American Games silver medalists for Canada
Swimmers from Montreal
Swimmers from Ottawa
Swimmers at the 1974 British Commonwealth Games
Swimmers at the 1975 Pan American Games
Swimmers at the 1976 Summer Olympics
Swimmers at the 1979 Pan American Games
Medalists at the 1976 Summer Olympics
Commonwealth Games medallists in swimming
Pan American Games medalists in swimming
Medalists at the 1975 Pan American Games
Medalists at the 1979 Pan American Games
Medallists at the 1974 British Commonwealth Games